Pullurampara, is a village situated near the town of Thiruvambady in the Calicut district of the Indian state of Kerala. It is approximately 42 km from Calicut and is in two panchayats, Thiruvambady and Kodencheri. Iruvanjippuzha river flows through Pullurampara. The two main junctions in Pullurampara are Pallippadi and Pullurampara valiyangaadi. St. Alphonsa Playground is the main Park. St. Joseph's Church is located in Pallippadi.

Education
The main education Center in Pullurampara is St. Joseph's Higher Secondary School.Hidayathul islam madrasa working under Hidayathul Islam Mahallu committee  is giving religious education from first to tenth standard.

Landmarks
Landmarks include St Joseph's Church in Pallippadi, two Mosques in Valiyangadi and a temple located near Ponnamkayam. Also, Bethaniya Renewal Center is located in Pullurampara Pallippadi. 

Arippara Waterfalls (അരിപ്പാറ) are around 4 km from Pullurampara. Anakkampoyil, Punnakkal, Ponnamkayam, Athippara, Murampathy, and Nellipoyil define the boundaries of Pullurampara. Thusharagiri Falls (തുഷാരഗിരി) is about 15 km away.

Transport
Pallippaalam (the bridge close to the church) across Iravanjipuzha connects Kodencheri and Thiruvambady panchayats. Another important bridge across Iruvanjippuzha is Elanthukadavu, which connects Pullurampara with Nellipoyil. KSRTC and private bus services are available. Bus service is available to Calicut Kuttiyadi, Kannur, Sulthan Bathery and Thodupuzha. Several bus services available to Thiruvambady, Thamarassery and Mukkam. Private taxi services are available for local transportation.

References

External links 
Thiruvambady
Pulloorampara (Tagzania)

 Villages in Kozhikode district
 Thamarassery area